Akhilesh Yadav (born 1 July 1973) is an Indian politician and national president of the Samajwadi Party who served as the 20th Chief Minister of Uttar Pradesh. Having assumed office on 15 March 2012 at the age of 38, he is the youngest person to have held the office.  Yadav is the Leader of Opposition in the Uttar Pradesh Legislative Assembly since March 2022, an elected Member of Parliament for Azamgarh in the 17th Lok Sabha, and the incumbent Member of Legislative Assembly for Karhal in the 18th Vidhan Sabha.

His first significant success in politics was being elected as the Member of the 13th Lok Sabha in the year 2000 for the Kannauj constituency. He is the son of Late Mulayam Singh Yadav, a veteran Indian politician and the founder of Samajwadi Party who served as Minister of Defence, Government of India and three term Chief Minister of Uttar Pradesh.

Early life and education
Yadav was born on 1 July 1973 in Saifai, Etawah District, Uttar Pradesh. He was born to Malti Devi and Mulayam Singh Yadav, later Chief minister of Uttar Pradesh. Malti Devi suffered complications while giving birth to Akhilesh which put her in a vegetative state. She died in 2003. With Mulayam Singh Yadav busy making a career in politics, Akhilesh was brought up mostly by his paternal grandparents.

He completed his early education in a local school in Saifai and then one in Etawah town. He was schooled at Dholpur Military School in Dholpur, Rajasthan, then obtained his Bachelor's and master's degrees in Civil Environmental Engineering at JSS Science and Technology University, Mysore, Karnataka, India. Akhilesh Yadav also holds a master's degree in environmental engineering from the University of Sydney, Australia.

Political career

Yadav was elected to the 13th Lok Sabha from Kannauj in a by-election in 2000. He was also a member of the Committee on Food, Civil Supplies, and Public Distribution. Yadav served as a Member of the Committee on Ethics from 2000 to 2001 and in 2004 was elected as a member of the 14th Lok Sabha for a second term. He was at times a member of the following committees: Committee on Urban Development, Committee on Provision of Computers for various departments, Committee on Science and Technology, and Committee on Environment and Forests.

From 2009–2012 Yadav was elected and served as a member of the 15th Lok Sabha for a second term. During this period he was a member of the following committees: Member of the Committee on Environment and Forests, Committee on Science and Technology, and the JPC on the 2G spectrum case. On 10 March 2012 he was appointed as leader of the Samajwadi Party in Uttar Pradesh. On 15 March 2012, at the age of 38, he became the Chief Minister of Uttar Pradesh, the youngest to hold the office.

In May 2012 Yadav resigned from the Kannauj parliamentary seat to further serve as the Chief Minister of Uttar Pradesh after his party won the Assembly elections. In the same month he became Member of the Uttar Pradesh Legislative council. In the 2017 Assembly elections, the SP-Congress Alliance headed by Yadav was unable to form the government. He submitted his resignation to Governor Ram Naik on 11 March.

The 2019 Indian general elections and 2022 Uttar Pradesh Legislative Assembly elections saw Yadav being elected to the parliament and state assembly simultaneously, with Yadav later retaining his state assembly seat, and thereby submitting his resignation in the Lok Sabha.

Chief Minister of Uttar Pradesh

Yadav was sworn in as the 20th Chief Minister of Uttar Pradesh on 15 March 2012, at the age of 38, winning 224 seats in the March 2012 assembly elections. During his tenure, the Agra-Lucknow Expressway, which is the most modern and longest expressway in India, being the first of its kind to be built in the shortest span of time, was completed and inaugurated. Yadav also launched the "UP100 Police Service", "Women Power Line 1090" and "108 Ambulance Service". Infrastructural accomplishments of his government include projects like the Lucknow Metro Rail, Lucknow International Ekana Cricket Stadium, Janeshwar Mishra Park (Asia's largest park), Jayaprakash Narayan International Convection Center, IT city, Lucknow-Ballia Purvanchal Expressway et al.

His chief ministerial tenure also saw emphasis on developing power sector, modernising the police force, setting up Kisan Bazaars and Mandis, introducing social welfare schemes such as Lohiya Awas Yojana, Kanya Vidya Dhan, Kisan Avam Sarvhit Bima Yojana, Pension Yojna and allotting unemployment allowances. Between 2012-2015, over 15 Lakh laptops were distributed to the 10th and 12th passout students by the Government of Uttar Pradesh, making it one of the largest distribution scheme by any Government in the world.

Law and Order situation 

Akhilesh Yadav government was repeatedly criticized on alleged poor law and order situation in UP. His tenure saw about a dozen Director General of Police (DGP) leading the Police force. Besides, the government was also charged with favouring senior cops belonging to a particular caste in the field postings. This political interference had been attributed as a major factor in the perceptible low police morale amongst cops and general policing in UP.   

There were numerous incidents of assault and killing of policemen. There were also large number of cases of communal violence and riots, including places like Muzaffarnagar, Mathura, Bareilly and Faizabad, in which several people were killed and thousands of others were displaced. Incidences like Jawahar Bagh episode and alleged phone threat case to ex IPS officer Amitabh Thakur were also cited as important cases of deteriorated law and order situation.

Positions held 
Akhilesh Yadav has been elected 1 time as MLA and 4 times as Lok Sabha MP.

Personal life 

Akhilesh Yadav is married to Dimple Yadav, who is a Member of Parliament. The couple have two daughters namely Aditi and Tina, and a son, Arjun. Akhilesh by profession, is a Civil engineer, agriculturist, and socio-political worker. He has a keen interest in sports, mainly football and cricket. His favourite pastimes are reading, listening to music, and watching films.

Since Yadav became chief minister, his family was divided into two feuding groups, one siding with him and the other with his uncle Shivpal Singh Yadav. Akhilesh had the support of his father's cousin, Ram Gopal Yadav, while Shivpal later went on to make his own political party, the Pragatisheel Samajwadi Party (Lohia), which ahead of 2022 elections joined the SP+ coalition, with Shivpal being elected as an MLA on an SP ticket.

Family Tree

Akhilesh's father Mulayam Singh Yadav has 4 real brothers and 1 cousin brother. The family tree of Yadav family is as follows:

  Ratan Singh Yadav (eldest uncle)
 Ranvir Singh Yadav (cousin)
 Tej Pratap Singh Yadav (nephew)
 Mulayam Singh Yadav (father)
 Akhilesh Yadav (himself)
 Prateek Yadav (step-brother)
 Abhay Ram Yadav (uncle)
 Dharmendra Yadav (cousin)
 Anurag Yadav (cousin)
 Rajpal Singh Yadav (uncle)
 Abhishek Yadav (cousin)
 Aryan Yadav (cousin)
 Shivpal Singh Yadav (youngest uncle)
 Aditya Yadav (cousin)
 Ram Gopal Yadav (cousin of Mulayam)
 Akshay Yadav (2nd cousin of Akhilesh)

Note: Prateek Yadav is son of Chandra Prakash Gupta and Sadhna Gupta (2nd wife of Mulayam).

References

External links

 

Akhilesh yadav is a politician

1973 births
Living people
University of Sydney alumni
People from Kannauj
India MPs 2004–2009
India MPs 2009–2014
India MPs 1999–2004
People from Etawah district
Chief Ministers of Uttar Pradesh
Lok Sabha members from Uttar Pradesh
A
Chief ministers from Samajwadi Party
India MPs 2019–present
Uttar Pradesh MLAs 2022–2027